Propionimicrobium lymphophilum is a Gram-positive bacterium which has been isolated from submaxillary tissue.

References 

Propionibacteriales
Bacteria described in 1916
Monotypic bacteria genera